The Ministry of Culture of Egypt is a ministry responsible for maintaining and promoting the culture of Egypt.

History and structure
After Egypt's independence from Britain during the July 1952 Revolution, the new regime establsihed the Ministry of National Guidance in November of that year, giving it wide responsibilities over boadcasting, journalism, press attaches and film censoring, as well as manging tourism, museums, theatre productions, and popular culture. It was considered based on the French model, but also shaped by the experiments of various Eastern Bloc countries with centralized production and dissemination of culture. The ministry was renamed by President Gamal Abdel Nasser in 1958 as the Ministry of Culture and National Guidance. 

During president Anwar Sadat's regime, the ministry was renamed and restructured a number of times. In the first cabinet in October 1970 there was a Ministry of Culture, with Tharwat Okasha, and a separate Ministry for National Guidance with Mohamed Fayek. Within a month the minister of culture was replaced with Badraldin Abughazi, and the Ministry of National Guidance renamed as the Ministry of Information with the same minister. After a further few months in May 1971 Ismail Ghamem replaced Abughazi. In 1979 it was the Ministry of Culture and Information  (during Mansour Hassan's tenure).

Under the Mubarak regime it became the Ministry of State for Culture in 1982, with the information portfolio spun off into a separate ministry yet again.

Affiliated agencies
 Supreme Council of Culture
 General Egyptian Book Organisation
 National Library and Archives (Dar al-Kutub)
 General Authority for Cultural Palaces
 Cairo Opera House
 Egyptian Arts Academy
 Department of Applied Arts
 The Fine Arts Sector
 Cultural Development Fund
 The Book and Publishing Commission

Events
The Ministry often sends delegations to participate in events. In 2015, the Ministry participated in events in Doha, Qatar. In November, 2018 the Ministry participated in the second annual Music Festival in Corsica.

Criticism
In January 2001, the Egyptian Ministry of Culture was criticized for withdrawing three novels  of homoerotic poetry by the well-known 8th Century classical Arabic poet Abu Nuwas from circulation.

Ministers

 Fathi Radwan, June 26, 1958 - October 7, 1958
 Tharwat Okasha, October 7, 1958 - September 27, 1962, and September 10, 1966 - November 18, 1970
 Mohammed Abdul Qader, September 27, 1962 - March 25, 1965
 Suleiman Hazien, 1 October 1965 - September 10, 1966
 Badr al-Din Abu Ghazi, November 18, 1970 - May 14, 1971
 Ismail Ghanem, May 14, 1971 - September 19, 1971
 Yusuf Sibai, March 27, 1973 - March 19, 1976
 Gamal Al 'atifi, March 19, 1976 - February 3, 1977
 Abdel Moneim El Sawy, February 3, 1977 - October 5, 1978
 Mansour Hassan, 19 June 1979 - 23 June 1981
 Mohammed Abdel-Hamid Radwan, September 22, 1981 - September 4, 1985
 Ahmed Heikal, September 5, 1985 - October 12, 1987
 Farouk Hosny, October 12, 1987 - January 28, 2011
 Gaber Asfour, January 21, 2011 - February 9, 2011 July 2014 - March 2015
 Mohamed Assawi, February 22, 2011 - March 3, 2011
 Emad Eddin Abu Ghazi, March 7, 2011 - November 20, 2011
 Shaker Abdel Hamid, December 7, 2011 - April 20, 2012
 Saber al-Arab, April 2012  - July 2014
 Abdel Wahed Al-Nabawi, March 2015 - August 2015
 Helmi Al-Namnam, August 2015 - January 2018
Ines Abdel-Dayem, January 2018 — August 2022
Nevine Al-Kilani, August 2022 —

See also
 Cabinet of Egypt

References

External links
The General Egyptian Book Authority official website
 Egypt's Cabinet Database

1958 establishments in Egypt
Ministries established in 1958
Culture
Egyptian culture
Egypt